Alexander Burgstaller (born 12 July 1999) is an Austrian footballer who plays as a defender for Wacker Innsbruck II.

Club career
On 31 July 2020, he signed with TSV Hartberg.

On 10 February 2021, he moved to Wacker Innsbruck II.

International career
He played for Austria Under-17 squad at the 2016 UEFA European Under-17 Championship.

References

1999 births
People from Braunau am Inn
Footballers from Upper Austria
Living people
Austrian footballers
Association football defenders
Austria youth international footballers
FC Juniors OÖ players
TSV Hartberg players
2. Liga (Austria) players
Austrian Regionalliga players